Lawless Border is a 1935 Western film directed by John P. McCarthy and written by Zarah Tazil. It was released in 1935 in the US by State Rights and Spectrum Pictures.

Premise 
A U.S. government agent and Mexican agent infiltrate a gang of smugglers who traffic arms across the border to supply the Mexican revolutionary forces.

Cast 
Bill Cody as the American agent
Molly O'Day as the Smuggler's sister
Martin Garralaga as the Mexican agent
Ted Adams
Joe de la Cruz
John Elliott
Merrill McCormick

See also 
 List of American films of 1935

References

External links 
 
 
 

1935 films
1935 Western (genre) films
American black-and-white films
American Western (genre) films
Films directed by John P. McCarthy
1930s American films
1930s English-language films